Gray Butte is a volcanic butte in the southeast corner of Jefferson County, Oregon, United States. It is composed of welded tuff and is a part of the Crooked River caldera. A recreation trail for hiking, horseback riding, and mountain biking leads up the side of the butte. The butte is located near the popular tourist site of Smith Rock.

References 

Buttes of Oregon
Landforms of Jefferson County, Oregon
Mountains of Oregon
Volcanoes of Oregon